Jeyran-e Sofla (also Romanized as Jeyrān-e Soflá; also known as Jārīḩān-e Pā’īn) is a village in Torkaman Rural District, in the Central District of Urmia County, West Azerbaijan Province, Iran. At the 2006 census, its population was 58, in 15 families.

References 

Populated places in Urmia County